In Christianity, missional living is the adoption of the posture, thinking, behaviors, and practices of a missionary to engage others with the gospel message. The missional church movement, a church renewal movement predicated on the necessity of missional living by Christians, gained popularity at the end of the twentieth century due to advocates like Tim Keller and others in the Gospel and Our Culture Network.  Advocates contrast missional living with the concept of a select group of "professional" missionaries, emphasizing that all Christians should be involved in the Great Commission of Jesus Christ.

Understanding missional
The missional living concept is rooted in the Missio dei (Latin, "the sending of God"). In 1934, Karl Hartenstein, a German missiologist, coined the phrase in response to Karl Barth and his emphasis on actio Dei ("the action of God"). In their view, missional activities stemming from God.  The Triune God is the primary acting agent in the world and within the church.

According to Lesslie Newbigin and Jesus' statements in the Gospel according to John, every Christian has been sent by Jesus with the gospel together in community to those in the surrounding culture for the sake of the King and His kingdom: “The Church is sent into the world to continue that which he came to do, in the power of the same Spirit, reconciling people to God.” Jesus said, “As the Father has sent Me, I am sending you” (John 20:21).
"No one can say: ‘Since I’m not called to be a missionary, I do not have to evangelize my friends and neighbors.’ There is no difference, in spiritual terms, between a missionary witnessing in his hometown and a missionary witnessing in Katmandu, Nepal. We are all called to go—even if it is only to the next room, or the next block.”"

A missional (missionary) perspective
Missional living is the embodiment of the mission of Jesus in the world by incarnating the gospel. "It is imperative that Christians be like Jesus, by living freely within the culture as missionaries who are as faithful to the Father and his gospel as Jesus was in his own time and place." This embodiment of the gospel is often referred to as "contextualization" or "inculturation."
"Both refer to more than a simple translation of the gospel into different languages and cultures in the way that one translates a history book or a science text. Rather, they point to the embodiment of the living Word in human culture and social settings in such a way that its divine nature and power are not lost. True contextualization is more than communication. It is God working in the hearts of people, making them new and forming them into a new community. It is his Word transforming their lives, their societies, their cultures."

These five biblical distinctives form the foundation of a missional perspective:

 The Church is sent by Jesus Christ (John 17:18; 20:21, Luke 9:2; Matthew 28:19–20; Acts 1:8)
 The Church is sent with the Cross (1 Cor 1:18, Eph 2:16, Col 2:14, 1 Pet 2:24, 2 Cor 5:17–24)
 The Church is sent in Community (Acts 2:42–47; 5:42; John 13:34–35; 1 John 3:16–17)
 The Church is sent to every Culture (John 1:14; Matthew 20:28; Acts 17:22–34; Luke 5:29)
 The Church is sent for the King and His Kingdom (Matthew 10:7; 25:34; Luke 4:43; Rev 11:15–17; Jeremiah 10:7; John 18:36)

Sent
Jesus sent His disciples on a mission. The missional church defines itself in terms of its mission—being sent ones who take the gospel to and incarnate the gospel within a specific culture. "Jesus was the first apostle. He was sent by his Father. He, in turn, sent the Twelve. They went to people who would then take the gospel to the rest of the world. Whoever received it would understand that they, too, had been sent. With the gospel being what it is, the church as bearer of the gospel is bound to be apostolic."

Cross
Jesus Christ said that He came to earth to seek and to save that which was lost (Luke 19:10). He accomplished salvation through the cross. By dying on the cross, He paid the penalty for sin and satisfied God’s wrath. According to Scripture, without the cross, there is no salvation, no forgiveness, and no hope; because of the cross, there is eternal life. The mission and message of Jesus surround the cross. “For the word of the cross is to those who are perishing foolishness, but to us who are being saved it is the power of God” (1 Cor 1:18).

Community
Jesus loves the Church and He gave His life to redeem the Church. Community exists for Mission! Christians are to bring the gospel together to the culture. "The church is called to do the work of Christ, to be the means of his action in and for the world....Mission, in its widest as well as its more focused senses, is what the church is there for. God intends to put the world to rights; he has dramatically launched this project through Jesus. Those who belong to Jesus are called, here and now, in the power of the Spirit, to be agents of that putting-to-rights purpose."

Culture
George Peters notes, “If man is to be reached, he must be reached within his own culture.”  This principle is observed when God became a man in the form of Jesus to come to earth and incarnate the gospel. As missionaries sent by Jesus, every Christian must learn to exegete their surrounding culture, uncovering the language, values, and ideas of the culture. Using this information, they take steps to reach people with the gospel message in the context of the surrounding culture.

King and Kingdom
The kingdom was central to Jesus’ message and mission. The Book of Acts ends with Paul, under house arrest in Rome, “proclaiming the kingdom of God and teaching about the Lord Jesus Christ with all boldness and without hindrance” (Acts 28:31). Christians are sent to proclaim the gospel of the kingdom so that others may enter the kingdom. George Hunsberger conveys the idea that the Church is pointing beyond itself to the kingdom of God. The Church is not an end in itself; God has a mission that goes beyond the Church which includes the kingdom. The kingdom and the Church must never be divorced, yet they also must never be equated. In a similar way, “the reign must never be separated from the One who reigns.”  The kingdom is always at the heart of the King.

The missional church
The missional church movement first arose during the end of the 20th century and the beginning of the 21st century. The movement seeks to rethink and redefine the nature of the church and create a new paradigm in which churches are seen as missional in nature, instead of attractional in nature. Leaders in the movement argue that instead of churches attempting to attract people to churches through church programs, churches should instead take the gospel outside of the church and engage society with the gospel, often by being involved not only in missions and evangelism but also in social justice movements. The missional church defines itself in terms of its mission — being sent ones who take the gospel to and incarnate the gospel within a specific cultural context. The church exists, in other words, for what we sometimes call "mission": to announce to the world that Jesus is its Lord.

"Mission is not just a program of the church. It defines the church as God’s sent people. Either we are defined by mission, or we reduce the scope of the gospel and the mandate of the church. Thus our challenge today is to move from church with mission to missional church."
The Church has a mission because Jesus has a mission. There is one mission.
"Missional church is a community of God’s people that defines itself, and organizes its life around, its real purpose of being an agent of God’s mission to the world. In other words, the church’s true and authentic organizing principle is mission. When the church is in mission, it is the true church. The church itself is not only a product of that mission but is obligated and destined to extend it by whatever means possible. The mission of God flows directly through every believer and every community of faith that adheres to Jesus. To obstruct this is to block God’s purposes in and through his people."

Missional living is a term that is used in contrast with historical institutional churches. Church leaders as well as Christians in general have often regarded the Church as an institution to which outsiders must come in order to receive a certain product, namely, the gospel and all its associated benefits. Institutional churches are sometimes perceived to exist for the members and depend on pastors and staff to evangelize the lost. The "missional church", on the other hand, attempts to take Christ to "the lost" and its members are personally engaged in reaching their communities with the message of Jesus Christ.

See also 
 Inculturation
 Missio dei
 Anchor Gaslamp
 Missional community
 Mosaic Church
 Dan Kimball
 Emerging church
 Erwin McManus
 Mark Driscoll
 Brian McLaren
 Don Miller (author)
 Derek Webb

Notes

Further reading
Theological and Philosophical Background
 John Bailey (Editor). Pursuing the Mission of God in Church Planting: The Missional Church in North America, NAMB (2007)
 David Bosch. Transforming Mission, Orbis Books, (1991)
 Neil Cole. Organic Church, Jossey-Bass (2005)
 David DeVries. Six-Word Lessons to Discover Missional Living, Leading on the Edge (August 2010).
 Michael Frost. Exiles: Living Missionally in a Post-Christian Culture, Hendrickson Publishers (July 25, 2006).
 Michael Frost and Alan Hirsch. The Shaping of Things to Come: Innovation and Mission for the 21st-Century Church, Hendrickson Publishers (November 2003).
 Darrell Guder (Editor), Missional Church: A Vision for the Sending of the Church in North America, Wm. B. Eerdmans Publishing Company (February 1998).
 Ross Hastings, Missional God, Missional Church: Hope for Re-Evangelizing the West,  IVP Academic (2012).
 Alan Hirsch. The Forgotten Ways: Reactivating the Missional Church, Brazos (2007).
 George R. Hunsberger and Craig Van Gelder eds., The Church Between Gospel and Culture: The Emerging Mission in North America, Wm. B. Eerdmans Publishing Company (March 1996).
 Helen Lee. The Missional Mom, Moody Publishers, (January 2011)
Patrick Keifert. We Are Here Now: A New Missional Era, Church Innovations Institute (2006)
 Dan Kimball. They Like Jesus But Not the Church, Zondervan (2007)
 Lesslie Newbigin. The Open Secret, Wm. B. Eerdmans Publishing Company (February 1995)
 Lesslie Newbigin. The Gospel in a Pluralist Society, Wm. B. Eerdmans Publishing Company (December 1989)
Practical Implications
 JR Woodward Creating a Missional Culture:  Equipping the Church for the Sake of the World, InterVarsity Press (2012)
 Alan J. Roxburgh The Missionary Congregation, Leadership & Liminality, Trinity Press International (1997)
 Alan J. Roxburgh and Fred Romanuk. The Missional Leader: Equipping Your Church to Reach a Changing World, Jossey-Bass (April 7, 2006).
 Ed Stetzer and David Putman. Breaking the Missional Code, B&H Publishing Group (May 2006).
 Craig Van Gelder The Essence of the Church: A Community Created by the Spirit, Baker Books (2000)
 Craig Van Gelder The Ministry of the Missional Church: A Community Led by the Spirit, Baker Books (2007)
 Frank Viola. From Eternity to Here, David C. Cook (2009)

External links

See the Missional Church Reading Room for extensive on-line library (Tyndale Seminary)

 
Christian terminology
Philosophy of life
Christian movements
Ecclesiology